Lasioglossum fratellum  is a Palearctic species of sweat bee.

References

External links
Images representing  Lasioglossum fratellum

Hymenoptera of Europe
fratellum
Insects described in 1903